Nexhat Daci (pronounced ; born June 26, 1944 in Veliki Trnovac, Bujanovac, Serbia) is a Kosovan politician. He was elected as the speaker of Assembly of Kosovo in 2001 as a member of President Ibrahim Rugova's Democratic League of Kosovo (LDK). In 2006, he was ousted from the speakership due to infighting within the LDK He is a member of the Assembly of Kosovo and the leader of the Democratic League of Dardania, which he founded following his unsuccessful bid to become leader of the Democratic League of Kosovo.

Acting President of Kosovo
Nexhat Daci was the acting President of Kosovo from January 21, 2006 following the death of Ibrahim Rugova, to February 11, 2006 when Fatmir Sejdiu was elected president.

Education
 1962-1966: University of Belgrade, Chemistry Section, Diploma in chemistry;
 1966-1968: University of Belgrade, Master studies, Master of Science;
 1969-1973: University of Zagreb, studies for doctorate, PhD in chemistry;
 1971: School of English Language, Folkestone, United Kingdom;
 1972: After Master Studies, Liège, Belgium;
 1973: Hydro project, Brno, Czechoslovakia;
 1974-1975: University of Bradford, United Kingdom, after PhD Studies.

Daci speaks English, Serbo-Croatian, German (passive) as well as his native Albanian.

He is an academic and is a member of the Academy of Science and Arts of Kosovo.

Activities and functions held, present and past
 1985: American Chemical Society- Regular Member;
 1987: European Academy for Environment, Tybigen, Germany – Regular Member;
 1994: Academy of Sciences and Arts of Kosovo (ASAK) – Regular Member;
 Participation in Congresses, Conferences, Symposia in the US, the UK, Germany, Italy, Turkey, Hungary, Slovenia, Croatia, Serbia, Albania, Kosovo.

Publications
 School Textbooks for primary and secondary school, and University – 10 in total;
 Scientific projects – 120 in total.

Other activities
 1970-1972: Manager of the Chemistry Section in the University of Pristina;
 1970: Professor in the University of Pristina, Faculty of Chemistry;
 1992—2001: Member of Parliament of the Republic of Kosovo;
 1992–present: Member of the General Council of the Democratic League of Kosovo, since its inception;
 1994—1998: General Secretary of the Academy of Sciences and Arts of Kosovo (ASAK);
 1998—2002: President of the Academy of Sciences and Arts of Kosovo (ASAK);
 2001 - 2006: Speaker of the Assembly of Kosovo

See also
 Ibrahim Rugova
 Democratic League of Dardania
 Democratic League of Kosovo
 Assembly of Kosovo

References

1944 births
Living people
People from Bujanovac
Democratic League of Kosovo politicians
Democratic League of Dardania politicians
Chairmen of the Assembly of the Republic of Kosovo
Prime ministers of Kosovo
Alumni of the University of Bradford
Albanian Muslims
University of Belgrade alumni
Kosovo Albanians
Albanians in Serbia
Members of the Academy of Sciences and Arts of Kosovo